The 1952–53 British Ice Hockey season featured the English National League and Scottish National League.

English National League

English Autumn Cup

Results

Scottish National League

Regular season

Playoffs
Semifinals
Dunfermline Vikings - Falkirk Lions 7:6 on aggregate (4:3, 3:3)
Ayr Raiders - Perth Panthers 10:3 on aggregate (7:1, 3:2)
Final
Ayr Raiders - Dunfermline Vikings 8:6 on aggregate (5:5, 3:1)

Scottish Autumn Cup

Results

Canada Cup

Results

References 

British
1952 in English sport
1953 in English sport
1952–53 in British ice hockey
1952 in Scottish sport
1953 in Scottish sport